Mobolize is a mobile device software company with headquarters in Los Altos, CA.

In 2013, Sprint announced a technology partnership with Mobolize. In October 2020, Akamai and Mobolize announced a partnership to offer security to mobile devices for enterprises. Mobolize's Data Management Engine will support Akamai Enterprise Threat Protector, a cloud secure web gateway (SWG).  In June 2021, Akamai expanded its partnership with Mobolize to include zero trust capabilities on mobile devices. 

Mobolize was recognized in 2014 by CTIA as winner of the Telecom Council Showcase. In 2015, Mobolize was recognized by LightReading as a Leading Lights finalist for Best New Mobile Product, and also by FierceWireless as a Fierce Innovation Awards finalist for Network Service Delivery. 

The company is led by Philip Mustain as chairman and CEO, David Cohen as Chief Business Officer, William Chow as CTO and Colleen LeCount as CRO. Philip Mustain and David Cohen were previously founders of Frontbridge Technologies, which was acquired by Microsoft and became Microsoft Exchange Hosted Services.  William Chow was previously the chief architect of  QLogic Storage Solutions Group (formerly Troika Networks)  and security team lead at Stamps.com. Colleen LeCount was General Manager of Global Product & Business Development for Sprint.

References

External links 

 The Data Optimization Paradox

Mobile software
Wireless networking
Security technology